João César Monteiro Santos (2 February 1939, in Figueira da Foz – 3 February 2003, in Lisbon) was a Portuguese film director, actor, writer and film critic.

Life and career 
João César Monteiro was born into a family with anti-clerical and anti-fascist ideals. His family moved to Lisbon when Monteiro was 15 years old to enable him to continue his studies. In 1963, with a grant from the Calouste Gulbenkian Foundation, Monteiro traveled to Great Britain to study at the London Film School (known then as the London School of Film Technique). In 1965 in Portugal, he began work on his first film, Quem Espera por Sapatos de Defunto Morre Descalço (Who Waits for the Deceased's Shoes Dies Barefoot), which would not be finished for five years due to financial problems. At the same time, he made the short documentary "Sophia de Mello Breyner Andresen", about the Portuguese poet. Monteiro also wrote film criticism for periodicals like Imagem, Diário de Lisboa and O Século.

His first feature film was Fragmentos de um Filme Esmola: A Sagrada Família (1972). In 1982 he made Silvestre an adaptation of traditional Portuguese folk stories. Silvestre was shown at the Venice Film Festival and was an important step in his international recognition. À Flor do Mar (1986), featuring Laura Morante, was shown at the Salsomaggiore Film Festival, where it won the Special Jury Prize. Monteiro returned to the Venice Film Festival in 1989 with Recordações da Casa Amarela (Silver Lion), a film that marked the introduction of the character João de Deus. In 1992, he made O Último Mergulho - esboço de filme, featuring Fabienne Babe.

A Comédia de Deus (Venice Film Festival, 1995), As Bodas de Deus (1999 Cannes Film Festival), Branca de Neve (Venice Film Festival, 2000) and Vai~E~Vem  (Cannes Film Festival, 2003) were his last works. Branca de Neve (Snow White) was highly controversial because much of the film consists of a black screen, although a densely composed audio track plays throughout.

Aesthetics 
One of the most controversial Portuguese filmmakers of his generation, João César Monteiro marked his presence in cinema with unclassifiable and polemic films made with idiosyncratic and somewhat experimental aesthetics, and influenced by his work as a film critic and a poet. In some of his last films, he played a recurrent protagonist, João de Deus, a remarkably articulated and over-sexualized character whose customary attitudes involved spontaneous streaks of hedonism, scandal and satire. 

Although a substantial portion of his work was received with perplexity and outrage by the average movie-going audience, he has been recognized by Portuguese and international critics and academicians as one of the most important Portuguese directors, along with Manoel de Oliveira.

Filmography

Director
 Sophia de Mello Breyner Andresen (documentary, 1969)
 Quem Espera por Sapatos de Defunto Morre Descalço (short, 1971)
 Fragmentos de um Filme-Esmola: A Sagrada Família (1972)
 Que Farei com Esta Espada? (1975)
 Amor de Mãe (1975)
 Os Dois Soldados (short, 1978)
 Veredas (1978)
 O Amor das Três Romãs (short, 1979)
 O Rico e o Pobre (short, 1979)
 Silvestre (1982)
 À Flor do Mar (1986)
 Recordações da Casa Amarela (1989)
 O Último Mergulho (1992)
 Passeio com Johnny Guitar (short, 1995)
 Lettera amorosa (short, 1995)
 O Bestiário ou o Cortejo de Orpheu (short, 1995)
 A Comédia de Deus (1995)
 Le Bassin de J.W. (1997)
 As Bodas de Deus (1999)
 Branca de Neve (2000)
 Vai~E~Vem (2003)

Actor
 Amor de Perdição by Manoel de Oliveira (1979)
 A Estrangeira by João Mário Grilo (1983)
 À Flor do Mar by João César Monteiro (1986)
 Doc's Kingdom by Robert Kramer (1987)
 Relação Fiel e Verdadeira by Margarida Gil (1989)
 Ricordi della casa gialla by João César Monteiro (1989)
 Conserva Acabada by João César Monteiro (1990)
 Paroles by Anne Benhaïem (1992)
 Rosa Negra by Margarida Gil (1992)
 Passeio com Johnny Guitar by João César Monteiro (1995)
 Lettera Amorosa by João César Monteiro (1995)e
 O Bestiário ou o Cortejo de Orpheu by João César Monteiro (1995)
 La commedia di Dio by João César Monteiro  (1995)
 Le Bassin de J.W. by João César Monteiro (1997)
 As Bodas de Deus by João César Monteiro (1999)
 Vai~E~Vem by João César Monteiro (2003)

Books
 Corpo Submerso (1959)
 Morituri te Salutant (1974)
 Le Bassin de John Wayne (1998)
 As Bodas de Deus (1998)
 Uma Semana Noutra Cidade (1999)

See also
Jorge Ferreira Chaves

References

Further reading
  O Cais do Olhar by José de Matos-Cruz, Portuguese Cinematheque, 1999
 Paulo Filipe Monteiro, "An Art in the Rough: The Cinema of João César Monteiro" in Impure Cinema by Lucia Nagib and Anne Jerslev. London and New York: I.B.Tauris, 2014

External links

Allmovie
Autobiography
João César Monteiro
JCM e a Derradeira Imagem

1939 births
2003 deaths
People from Figueira da Foz
Portuguese film directors
Deaths from cancer in Portugal
Alumni of the London Film School